Gertner is a surname. Notable people with the surname include:

Ala Gertner (1912–1945), jewish prisoner in Auschwitz, participated in the Sonderkommando revolt in 1944
Joel Gertner (born 1975), American professional wrestling announcer and manager
Johan Vilhelm Gertner (1818–1871), Danish painter
Nancy Gertner (born 1946), United States federal judge
Paul Gertner, American magician
Shloime Gertner, English Hasidic Jewish singer

Jewish surnames